is a Japanese voice actress from Kanagawa, Japan.

Voice roles

Anime
Tsuki wa Higashi ni Hi wa Nishi ni: Operation Sanctuary as Mikoto Amagasaki

OVA
Suika

Visual novels
2000
Natural
Aries

2001
Suika
Lagnalock
Univ
Yukigatari
Pia Carrot 3 (video game) as Akemi Hasegawa
Snow Radish Vacation (video game) as Arisu Takatsukasa

2002
Popotan as Nono
Boku to, bokura no natsu
D.C.: Da Capo

2003
Run
Magistr Temple
Tsuki wa Higashi ni Hi wa Nishi ni: Operation Sanctuary
Tamakyū
Akibakei Kanojo as Tamae Akiyoshi

2004
Like Life
Paradise Lost
Haru no Ashioto
Tsui no Yakata
Rakuen ~Ai kawarazuna boku no baii~ as Ann

2005
Yotsunoha
Homemaid
Festa!! -Hyper Girls Pop-
Tsuyokiss
Swan Song as Aroe Yasaka
Dyogrammaton
Otome wa Boku ni Koishiteru as Ichiko Takashima
_summer

2006
Runasō as Sora
Tsumashibari
Gakuto
Boy Meets Girl as Mao Shingyouji
Kono Aozora ni Yakusoku o as Rokujo Miyaho

2007
Yuugeki Keikan PATVESSEL as Kaede Amatsuki

2009
Itazura Gokuaku as Amatsuki Kaede

2012
Kindred Spirits on the Roof as Nagatani Megumi and Sonou Tsukuyo

External links
Junko Kusayanagi's personal website 

Japanese voice actresses
Living people
Year of birth missing (living people)